Ravaya is a Sri Lankan Sinhala newspaper published by Victor Ivan. Established in 1987, it is known for its radical political views. Ravaya was a staunch supporter of Chandrika Kumaratunga in 1994. Ravaya is an intellectuals forum for non traditional analysis of social, political, cultural and judicial views of Sri Lanka.  Victor Ivan has lately taken the path of Mahathma Gandhi and is in the process of applying Gandhism to Sri Lanka.

See also
List of newspapers in Sri Lanka

References

External links
 Ravaya online edition

Newspapers established in 1987
Sinhala-language newspapers published in Sri Lanka
Sunday newspapers published in Sri Lanka